Henry Bowes Howard, 11th Earl of Suffolk, 4th Earl of Berkshire (1686 – 21 March 1757) was an English peer.

He was the son of Craven Howard and Mary Bowes. He married his full cousin Catherine Graham, daughter of Colonel James Grahme and Dorothy Howard (Dorothy and Craven were full siblings, both being children of William Howard, son of Thomas Howard, 1st Earl of Berkshire), on 5 March 1708 or 1709. They had nine children:
Lady Diana Howard (13 January 1709 or 1710 – January 1712–13)
Henry Howard, Viscount Andover (31 December 1710 – 1717)
Hon.? James Howard (died young)
William Howard, Viscount Andover (1714–1756)
Lady Catherine Howard (b. 1716, died young)
Hon. Charles Howard (1719 – 28 September 1773)
Thomas Howard, 14th Earl of Suffolk (1721–1783)
Hon. Graham Howard (1723–1737)
Lady Frances Howard (b. 17 June 1725, died young)

On 12 April 1706, he succeeded his great-uncle, Thomas, as Earl of Berkshire. After the death of Henry Howard, 6th Earl of Suffolk in 1718, he was appointed Deputy Earl Marshal, an office he held until 1725. In 1745, he succeeded a distant cousin as Earl of Suffolk, and became Recorder of Lichfield in 1755. His son William having been killed in a chaise accident in the previous year, was succeeded on his death in 1757 by his grandson Henry.

External links
 The Peerage

1686 births
1757 deaths
Henry
Henry
Henry Howard, 11th Earl of Suffolk